Eugene Entsir, professionally known as Eugy, is a Ghanaian, British singer, rapper, and songwriter. He is best known for his 2016 International hit single "Dance For Me" alongside Mr Eazi, which led to a 2017 MOBO Awards nomination. In 2018, Eugy a record signed with Tinie Tempah's Disturbing London.

Career
Eugy started writing and recording music at around age 14, having moved to London, UK from Ghana eight years prior. He originally started as a grime MC moving more towards afrobeats after being inspired by highlife musicians he grew up listening to such as Daddy Lumba and Kojo Antwi.

His career took off after Nigerian artist Davido reached out to him after seeing a freestyle video he posted online. This resulted in a collaboration and the release of Eugy's debut single, "'Chance", in 2015. However, his profile increased drastically following the international success of 2016 single "Dance For Me" with Mr Eazi, which is considered by some to be 'UK Afrobeats' first bonafide smash'.

Following a string of releases, Eugy signed with Disturbing London in April 2018 whilst also supporting Wizkid at the sold out Afrorepublik Show at the O2 Arena. He followed this with the release of “Tick Tock” as well as "L.O.V.E" alongside Ghanaian artist King Promise. Eugy would go on to release hit single "LoLo", releasing in March 2019 which was followed by popular remixes by Columbian artist/songstress Farina & Tanzanian crooner Harmonize.

Discography

Selected singles

Extended plays

References

1988 births
Living people
21st-century Ghanaian male singers
21st-century Ghanaian singers
English songwriters
English male rappers
Rappers from London
English people of Ghanaian descent
Black British male rappers
21st-century British male singers
British male songwriters